Daniel Rodrigo Stingo Camus (born 3 November 1965) is a Chilean lawyer who was elected as a member of the Chilean Constitutional Convention.

References

External links
 

Living people
1965 births
20th-century Chilean lawyers
Chilean people of Italian descent
21st-century Chilean politicians
Members of the Chilean Constitutional Convention
Pontifical Catholic University of Chile alumni
People from Viña del Mar
Christian Democratic Party (Chile) politicians
Democratic Revolution politicians
21st-century Chilean lawyers